The North American Football League (NAFL) was a proposed american spring football minor league. In 2014, the league announced it was to begin play for the 2016 season; however, there have been no further announcements that the league has met any of their listed key dates as of April 1, 2016.

The league were scheduled to run tryouts on March 15, 2015, in Monroeville, Pennsylvania, and charged prospective recruits over $100. However, it was reported that nobody from the league actually attended the tryouts. The league stated that the tryouts had been postponed to March 29 but the local representatives had failed to notify attendees. A later tryout in the Atlanta area would be cancelled the morning of the scheduled date.

In May 2017, league chairman Christopher White, and his wife, Tracy, were charged with grand theft in defrauding a potential investor of $150,000. They are alleged to have taken up for $700,000 with no intent on actually launching a functioning league and an affiliated production company for broadcasting games.

Proposed teams

References

External links
North American Football League official website

 
American football leagues in the United States
Sports leagues established in 2010
2010 establishments in the United States